The Barbaro stakes is an American Thoroughbred horse race:

 Barbaro Stakes at Pimlico Race Course (formerly the Sir Barton Stakes at Pimlico Race Course)
 Barbaro Stakes at Delaware Park